Evelis Jazmin Aguilar Torres (born 3 January 1993) is a Colombian athlete competing in the combined events. Earlier in her career she specialised in the 400 metres sprint.

With a personal best of 6346 points, she is the current national record holder in the heptathlon.

International competitions

Personal bests
Outdoor
200 metres – 23.62 (-0.1 m/s, Medellín 2016)
400 metres – 51.93 (Ibagué 2021)
800 metres – 2:10.06 (Cali 2016)
100 metres hurdles – 13.79 (+0.6 m/s, Madrid 2020)
400 metres hurdles – 57.90 (Cali 2015)
High jump – 1.77 (Barranquilla 2018)
Long jump – 6.58 (+0.6 m/s, Ibagué 2021)
Triple jump – 12.39 (+0.6 m/s, Ponce 2014)
Shot put – 14.79 (Cartagena 2019)
Javelin throw – 48.90 (Brussels 2017)
Heptathlon – 6346 (Ibagué 2021)

References

Living people
1993 births
Colombian heptathletes
Colombian female sprinters
Athletes (track and field) at the 2011 Pan American Games
Athletes (track and field) at the 2015 Pan American Games
Athletes (track and field) at the 2016 Summer Olympics
Olympic athletes of Colombia
Pan American Games medalists in athletics (track and field)
Pan American Games bronze medalists for Colombia
World Athletics Championships athletes for Colombia
South American Games silver medalists for Colombia
South American Games medalists in athletics
Competitors at the 2014 South American Games
Central American and Caribbean Games silver medalists for Colombia
Competitors at the 2018 Central American and Caribbean Games
Central American and Caribbean Games medalists in athletics
Medalists at the 2011 Pan American Games
Athletes (track and field) at the 2020 Summer Olympics
Sportspeople from Antioquia Department
South American Championships in Athletics winners
20th-century Colombian women
21st-century Colombian women